Elvis Kabashi (born 20 February 1994) is an Albanian professional footballer who plays as a left midfielder for Italian  club Reggiana.

Early life
Kabashi was born in Massa by an Albanian family.

Career

Juventus
Following a successful loan spell playing with the Juventus youth team, for a loan fee of €150,000, Kabashi was signed outright from Empoli for a fee of €700,000 in a 4-year contract. He signed for Juventus alongside fellow Empoli youth player Daniele Rugani.

In summer 2014, he was loaned to Eerste Divisie side Den Bosch and in 2015, he was signed by Pontedera. On 31 August 2016 the loan was renewed.

Renate
On 23 July 2019, he signed with Serie C club Renate.

Reggiana
On 29 August 2022, Kabashi signed a one-season contract with Reggiana.

References

External links
 
 
 
 Sky Sports profile

1994 births
Living people
People from Massa
Association football wingers
Albanian footballers
Empoli F.C. players
Delfino Pescara 1936 players
FC Den Bosch players
U.S. Città di Pontedera players
U.S. Viterbese 1908 players
U.S. Livorno 1915 players
FC Dinamo București players
A.C. Renate players
Como 1907 players
A.C. Reggiana 1919 players
Serie B players
Eerste Divisie players
Serie C players
Liga I players
Albanian expatriate footballers
Albanian expatriate sportspeople in Italy
Expatriate footballers in Italy
Albanian expatriate sportspeople in the Netherlands
Expatriate footballers in the Netherlands
Albanian expatriate sportspeople in Romania
Expatriate footballers in Romania
Sportspeople from the Province of Massa-Carrara
Footballers from Tuscany